This article is a list of fictional characters who are featured in British teen drama Skins, that follows the lives of a group of teenagers in Bristol, South West England, through the two years of sixth form. Its controversial story-lines have explored issues like dysfunctional families, mental illness (such as depression, eating disorders, post-traumatic stress disorder, and bipolar disorder), adolescent sexuality, gender, substance abuse, death, and bullying.

Each episode generally focuses on a particular character or subset of characters and the struggles they face in their lives, with the episodes named after the featured characters. The show was created by father-and-son television writers Bryan Elsley and Jamie Brittain for Company Pictures,

Overview

First generation

Second generation

Third generation

References

Channel 4-related lists
Lists of British drama television series characters